Michelle Thompson was a member of the US national taekwondo team. She was the 1993 and 1994 NCTA bantam weight champion. She represented the U.S. at the 1995 world championships in the Philippines taking silver.
Currently working as a flight attendant. Michelle participated in the 2020 Netflix original show titled “The Floor is Lava,” being the first person on her team to complete the course.

References

University of North Carolina at Greensboro alumni
American female taekwondo practitioners
Living people
Year of birth missing (living people)
World Taekwondo Championships medalists
20th-century American women